Bag It! is a puzzle game developed by American studio Hidden Variable Studios and released on October 15, 2011 for iOS and Android. The player is tasked with bagging up a collection of grocery items, with a gameplay similar to Tetris.

Critical reception
The game has a rating of 93% on Metacritic based on 4 critic reviews.

References

2011 video games
Android (operating system) games
IOS games
Puzzle video games
Video games developed in the United States